Vladislao Wenceslao Cap (5 July 1934 – 14 September 1982) was an Argentine football player and manager. As a player he represented his native country at the 1962 FIFA World Cup in Chile as a defender. Twelve years later he was the manager of the Argentina national football team at the 1974 FIFA World Cup.

Playing career
Cap played for Argentine club sides Arsenal de Llavallol (1952), Quilmes (1953), Racing Club (1954–1960), Club Atlético Huracán (1961), River Plate (1962–1965) and Vélez Sársfield (1966).

He played 11 matches with the national team, scoring one goal, and won the 1959 Copa América.

Managerial career
Cap was manager of Ferro Carril Oeste from 1968–1969, the Argentina national team for the 1974 world cup (alongside José Varacka), Platense in 1980 and Boca Juniors in 1982, amongst others.

Death
Cap was hospitalized with a lungs disease in September 1982 and died shortly thereafter.

References

External links

1934 births
1982 deaths
Argentine footballers
Argentine people of Polish descent
Argentine people of Hungarian descent
Association football defenders
1962 FIFA World Cup players
Racing Club de Avellaneda footballers
Club Atlético Huracán footballers
Club Atlético Vélez Sarsfield footballers
Club Atlético River Plate footballers
Quilmes Atlético Club footballers
Arsenal de Sarandí footballers
Argentine Primera División players
Argentina international footballers
Argentine football managers
Argentina national football team managers
1974 FIFA World Cup managers
Ferro Carril Oeste managers
Club Atlético Platense managers
Boca Juniors managers
Club Atlético River Plate managers
Atlético Junior managers
L.D.U. Quito managers
Deaths from edema
Copa América-winning players
Deportivo Cali managers
Sportspeople from Avellaneda